The Rochester Orchestra (RO) was an American orchestra based in the city of Rochester, New York that was active from 1912 to 1919. The orchestra was formed in 1912 as a restructuring of Mathias Dossenbach's Dossenbach Orchestra which had been playing in the city of Rochester since 1900. When George Eastman formed the new Rochester Philharmonic Orchestra (RPO) in 1919 the RO was disbanded and many of its members became a part of the RPO.

References

1912 establishments in New York (state)
1919 disestablishments in New York (state)
Disbanded American orchestras
Musical groups established in 1912
Musical groups disestablished in 1919
Musical groups from Rochester, New York